The federal districts (federalnyye okruga) are groupings of the federal subjects of Russia. Federal districts are not mentioned in the nation's constitution, and do not have competences of their own and do not manage regional affairs. They exist solely to monitor consistency between the federal and regional bodies of law, and ensuring governmental control over the civil service, judiciary, and federal agencies, operating in the regions.

List of federal districts 

Source:

History

The federal districts of Russia were established by President Vladimir Putin in 2000 to facilitate the federal government's task of controlling the then 89 federal subjects across the country. 

On 19 January 2010, the new North Caucasian Federal District split from the Southern Federal District.

In March 2014, after the annexation of Crimea, the Crimean Federal District was established. The legality of this annexation is disputed by an overwhelming majority of countries. On 28 July 2016 the Crimean Federal District was abolished and merged into the Southern Federal District in order to improve governance.

In November 2018, Buryatia and Zabaykalsky Krai were removed from the Siberian Federal District and added to the Far Eastern Federal District in accordance with a decree issued by Putin. The Administrative Centre of the Far Eastern Federal District relocated from Khabarovsk to Vladivostok in December 2018.

In 2022, the Administrative Centre of the Volga Federal District will relocate from Nizhny Novgorod to Samara within a few years.  In the Northwestern Federal District, Murmansk Oblast will be merged into the Republic of Karelia, also within a few years.

Presidential plenipotentiary envoys

Central Federal District
Igor Shchyogolev (since 26 June 2018)
Southern Federal District
Vladimir Ustinov (since 12 May 2008)
Northwestern Federal District
Aleksandr Gutsan (since 7 November 2018)
Far Eastern Federal District
Yury Trutnev (since 31 August 2013)
Siberian Federal District
Anatoly Seryshev (since 12 October 2021)
Ural Federal District
Nikolay Tsukanov (since 26 June 2018)
Volga Federal District
Igor Komarov (since 7 September 2018)
North Caucasian Federal District
Yury Chaika (since 22 January 2020)

See also
Economic regions of Russia, a similar grouping of the federal subjects of Russia for economic and statistical purposes.
Military districts of Russia, a similar grouping of federal subjects of Russia for military purposes
Zonal Councils of India, a similar entity in India to a Russian federal district
List of countries and dependencies by area

References

External links
Wilson Center article on Russia's federal districts

 
Political divisions of Russia
Federalism in Russia
Lists of subdivisions of Russia